The discography of the Japanese singer/songwriter Chisato Moritaka consists of thirteen studio albums, seven compilation albums, and forty singles released since 1987.

Albums

Studio albums

Live albums

Compilations

Extended plays

Remix albums

Collaborations

Karaoke albums

Singles

Regular singles

Promotional singles

Collaboration singles

Other recordings 
As a featured artist

As a guest artist

As a songwriter

Videography

Music videos 

As a featured artist

Other versions
 "Michi" (Chisato-hime no Bōken)
 "Futari wa Koibito" (Color Version)

Music video albums

Live video albums 

As a guest artist

Exclusive releases

Video games

Footnotes

References

External links 
 

Discography
Discographies of Japanese artists
Pop music discographies